Fredrick Sheldon (born in Barry, Vale of Glamorgan, Wales) was a footballer who played in The Football League for Aberdare Athletic. He initially played for Barry Town and was transferred to Swansea Town in 1919. In the South Wales derby between Swansea Town and Cardiff City in 1919, Sheldon famously scored both goals as Swansea recovered from a 1–0 deficit to win 2–1.

References

Welsh footballers
Aberdare Athletic F.C. players
English Football League players
Year of birth missing
Year of death missing
Association football midfielders